is a passenger railway station located in the city of Yoshinogawa, Tokushima Prefecture, Japan. It is operated by JR Shikoku and has the station number "B10".

Lines
Only local trains stop at the station.

Layout
The station consists of a side platform serving a single curved section of track. The station building is unstaffed and serves only as a waiting room.

Adjacent stations

History
When the company was nationalized on 1 September 1907, Japanese Government Railways took over control of the station and operated it as part of the Tokushima Line (later the Tokushima Main Line). With the privatization of Japanese National Railways, the successor of Japanese Government Railways, on 1 April 1987, the station came under the control of JR Shikoku. On 1 June 1988, the line was renamed the Tokushima Line.

Surrounding area
Yoshinogawa Medical Center
Yoshinogawa City Nishioe Elementary School

See also
 List of Railway Stations in Japan

References

External links

 JR Shikoku timetable

Railway stations in Tokushima Prefecture
Railway stations in Japan opened in 1899
Yoshinogawa, Tokushima